Andersons may refer to:

People
Andrew Andersons (born 1942), an Australian architect
Jānis Andersons (born 1986), a Latvian ice hockey player

Other uses
Anderson baronets, nine baronetcies, all extinct
Clan Anderson, a Scottish clan
The Andersons, an American agriculture company
Andersons (soccer), an American soccer club active in the 1930s

See also

Anderson (disambiguation)